Horseshoe Bend Station is a pastoral lease that operates as a cattle station in the Alice Springs region of the Northern Territory.

The property includes a  desert block that has never been developed. The station was originally a staging post for the Overland Telegraph Line and the North–South Road, with a hotel and post office.
 

The area around the station was hit hard by drought in 1897, so much so that several of the surrounding properties were abandoned. The second owners of the property were the firm of Sargeant and Elliot, who also operated the hotel. They restocked the property with cattle; in 1908 they sent stock in 16 railway cattle cars from Oodnadatta to Adelaide and an unspecified number from Warrina. Mr Sargeant, described as "one of the oldest and best-known residents of the far north", died in 1912.

Pastor Carl Strehlow, the founder of Hermannsburg, died and was buried at the station. He arrived at Horseshoe Bend in 1922 after a  buggy ride from Hermannsburg while en route to reach medical treatment in Adelaide.

By 2018, Horseshoe Bend Station was reported to be run by Viv Oldfield who also owned other properties nearby including Clifton Hills Station, Andado Station and Pandie Pandie Station.

See also
List of ranches and stations

References

Pastoral leases in the Northern Territory
Stations (Australian agriculture)